Kevon Villaroel (born December 17, 1987 in Diego Martin) is a Trinidadian soccer player who currently plays for the Central FC of the TT Pro League

Career

Youth and Amateur 

Villaroel attended Fatima College and St. Anthony College in his native Trinidad, winning both the North Zone Intercol and National Intercol with Fatima College, also winning the silver medal for finishing second in the BGTT League, scoring seven goals and eleven assists that season. Kevon was also named in the National All Star Team that year, and was a member of the U-17 side of Trindadian club Super Star Rangers, Joe Public FC, San Juan Jabloteh Reserves respectively.

Professional 

Villaroel began his professional career with San Juan Jabloteh in 2007, helping the team to the TT Pro League title in 2007 and 2008. In 2009, he moved to the Puerto Rico Islanders of the USL First Division reaching to the CONCACAF Champions League Semi Final in 2009 and winning the USSF Division 2 Pro League Championship 2010. At the end of his third season with the Puerto Rico Islanders he moved back to his native Trinidad and Tobago to play with his longtime rival North East Stars instantly helping them win the 2012 Toyota Classic Cup. Villaroel stamped an instant impression in the league which he was rewarded with his first National Senior team call up. After finishing the 2013-2014 season he moved from his home land to join Belgian team CS Visé of the Belgian Third Division. Villaroel successfully completed his move on the transfer window deadline day. After CS Visé financial failure in the 2015-2016 season Villaroel then joined current TT Pro League and CFU Club Championship Winners Central FC where he helped the club to a very successful season winning TT Pro League CFU Club Championship First Citizens Cup Digicel Pro Bowl and their birth in the CONCACAF Champions League 2015-2016. Villaroel is currently a squad player for the Trinidad and Tobago National Senior Team.

International 
Villaroel was called up to the senior Trinidad and Tobago in 2013 and was also in the squad for a friendly against Grenada in March 2016. In 2017 he was part of the senior team 2017 Concacaf World Cup Qualifiers squad.

International goals
Scores and results list Trinidad and Tobago'a goal tally first.

Honors

San Juan Jabloteh 

 TT Pro League: 2007, 2008
 First Citizens Cup Winner

Puerto Rico Islanders 

 CFU Club Championship: Winner 2010, 2011
 USSF Division 2 Pro League Championship: 2010
 North American Soccer League: Semi Finalist 2011

North East Stars 

Toyota Classic Cup: Winner 2012

Central FC 

 CFU Club Championship: Winner 2015
 TT Pro League Winner 2014-2015
 First Citizens Cup Winner 2015
 Digicel Pro Bowl Winner 2015
 TT Pro League Winner 2015-2016
 CFU Club Championship: Winner 2016
 TT Pro League Winner 2016-2017

References

External links 
 Puerto Rico Islanders bio

1987 births
Living people
Trinidad and Tobago footballers
Puerto Rico Islanders players
Trinidad and Tobago expatriate footballers
Expatriate footballers in Puerto Rico
USL First Division players
USSF Division 2 Professional League players
North American Soccer League players
Trinidad and Tobago expatriate sportspeople in Puerto Rico
TT Pro League players
San Juan Jabloteh F.C. players
North East Stars F.C. players
Association football wingers